The Tour of the Battenkill is a single-day road cycling race held in the Battenkill valley, in Washington County, New York.   It is 62.2 miles long, includes many hills, dirt and gravel road sections and as of 2011 it has been held seven times. In 2011, Brett Tivers won the men's race and Lex Albrecht won the women's race In 2014 Kathleen Giles won the woman's race. From 2010 to 2012, the race was rated as a 1.2 event on the UCI America Tour.

Men's results

References

External links

Cycle races in the United States
Road bicycle races